The South African Musicians' Alliance (SAMA) is a union, artist collective, and resistance movement formed by musicians in South Africa who opposed the censorship and suppression of the apartheid regime. The alliance was formed sometime before 1983. SAMA musicians flouted the government's imposed racial segregation and restrictions on music content. Three of SAMA's priorities were freedom of speech, freedom of movement, and freedom of association.

One prominent spokesperson of the organisation was pianist Rashid Lanie.

See also
 Internal resistance to apartheid

References

Further reading
 
 

Anti-Apartheid organisations
African artist groups and collectives
Freedom of expression organizations
Political organisations based in South Africa
Censorship in South Africa